Norris Edward Boulting (born 11 July 1969) is a British sports journalist, television presenter and podcaster best known for his coverage of football, cycling and darts.

Early life and education

Boulting was born in Andover, Hampshire but moved to Bedford as a child. He attended Bedford School, where he studied for A-levels in French, German and English, before reading modern languages at Jesus College, Cambridge. He is the grandson of film director John Boulting

Career
After several "completely directionless" years, his television career began in 1997 when he joined Sky Sports' Soccer Saturday alongside Jeff Stelling. He joined ITV Sports in 2001, and has covered a range of football events including the UEFA Champions League, UEFA Europa League and the FA Cup. He became a reporter for ITV's Tour de France coverage in 2003 and has reported at every Tour since, as well as on other cycling events including the Tour of Britain and the Vuelta a España. He also covered the London 2012 Summer Paralympics for Channel 4. He was awarded the Royal Television Society's Sports News Reporter of the Year Award in 2006. Boulting branched out into commentating in 2015, providing commentary for ITV4's coverage of the inaugural Tour de Yorkshire and the Vuelta a España alongside David Millar. Boulting and Millar commentated for ITV4 on the 2016 Tour de France and subsequent ones.
Boulting produced and directed Dutch Master – A tribute to Dennis Bergkamp for Sky Sports in 1998, and Steven Gerrard – A Year in My Life for Sky 1 in 2006.

Following on from the success of his Bikeology tour, in 2018 Ned announced his newly revamped 'Tour de Ned'. A one-man theatrical cycling roadshow that tours the UK in conjunction with the Tour de France from 28 September - 17 November.

Boulting made his darts commentary debut at the 2020 Masters after being a long term pundit for ITV Sport PDC events.

Since April 2020 Boulting has co-presented the podcast Streets Ahead with Adam Tranter and Laura Laker. The podcast involves discussions of active travel infrastructure and often includes interviewing guests.

Books
How I Won the Yellow Jumper: Dispatches from the Tour de France (Yellow Jersey Press, 2011) 
 On The Road Bike: The Search For A Nation’s Cycling Soul (Yellow Jersey Press, 2013) 
 101 Damnations: Dispatches from the 101st Tour de France (Yellow Jersey Press, 2014) 
 Square Peg, Round Ball: Football, TV and Me (Bloomsbury, 2022)

References

1969 births
Living people
People educated at Bedford School
Alumni of Jesus College, Cambridge
British television presenters
English sports broadcasters
People from Andover, Hampshire
Cycling announcers
English association football commentators